Chata Rock is a low isolated rock over which the sea breaks heavily constantly, lying  south of Cape Lancaster, the southern end of Anvers Island, in the Palmer Archipelago. The name appears on an Argentine government chart of 1950 and is probably descriptive, "chata" being a Spanish word for "flat".

References 

Rock formations of the Palmer Archipelago